Rich Hill may refer to:

Places
 Rich Hill, Arizona, an early gold mine near Weaver, Arizona
 Rich Hill (Bel Alton, Maryland), listed on the National Register of Historic Places
 Rich Hill, Missouri, a city in Missouri
 Rich Hill (Sassafras, Maryland), listed on the National Register of Historic Places
 Rich Hill, Ohio, an unincorporated community in Knox County
 Rich Hill (Ohio), a summit in Knox County
 Rich Hill Township, Muskingum County, Ohio

People
 Rich Hill (baseball coach) (born ), American head baseball coach at the University of Hawaii at Manoa
 Rich Hill (pitcher) (born 1980), American baseball player

Media
 Rich Hill (film), a 2014 American documentary film

See also
 Richhill (disambiguation)
 Richard Hill (disambiguation)
 

Hill, Rich